"Running with the Night" is the second single released from American singer and songwriter Lionel Richie's multi-platinum and Grammy Award-winning 1983 album, Can't Slow Down. Richie co-wrote the song with songwriter Cynthia Weil and co-produced it with James Anthony Carmichael.

Recording
The electric guitar solo on "Running with the Night" was played by Steve Lukather, best known as a member of the rock band Toto. Lukather sat down in the studio and the engineer played the basic tracks of the song, for him to hear for the first time, so he could plan his part. As the music played, he jammed along on his instrument. At the conclusion of the tune, he said to the engineer, "Okay, I'm ready for a take." The producer replied, "That was a take." Some adult contemporary stations edited out Lukather's guitar solo. Singer Richard Marx added backing vocals on the track as a session singer; he had also lent his vocals to Richie's "All Night Long (All Night)" and "You Are".

Reception
Released as the follow-up single to Richie's hit "All Night Long (All Night)", "Running with the Night" became another Billboard Hot 100 top ten for the singer, peaking at #7 in early 1984. The song also reached the top ten on two other Billboard charts that year, topping out at #6 on both the adult contemporary and R&B charts. "Running with the Night" also made the top ten on the UK Singles Chart, reaching #9 in January 1984.

In its contemporary review of the single, Cash Box said that "Richie presents a dramatic, smooth, mid-tempo tale of tripping the light fantastic, and he once again proves his ability to synthesize a melting pot of styles."  In a positive retrospective review Stephen Thomas Erlewine of AllMusic wrote "he even adds a bit of rock with the sleek nocturnal menace of 'Running With the Night,' one of the best songs here. He doesn't swing for the fences like Michael did in 1982; he makes safe bets, which is more in his character."

Music video
The music video for the song was directed by Bob Giraldi. It begins at a wedding reception, and focuses on a bridesmaid (Sheila E.) who sits alone. It then cuts to Richie and a group of men who pair up with women, except for Richie. They dance through streets and then crash the wedding reception during which Richie then pairs up with the lonely bridesmaid. The wedding guests and Richie's company then dance together.

Charts

Weekly charts

Year-end charts

Samples
Rihanna sampled this song on "Push Up On Me", a track from her 2007 album Good Girl Gone Bad. Both Richie and Weil are given songwriter credit.

References

External links
Single release info from discogs.com

1983 singles
Lionel Richie songs
Music videos directed by Bob Giraldi
Songs written by Lionel Richie
Songs with lyrics by Cynthia Weil
1983 songs
Motown singles
Song recordings produced by James Anthony Carmichael